Medicine Ball is an American medical drama television series that aired from March 13 until May 15, 1995.

Premise
Medical drama set at a hospital in Seattle where a group of young doctors are about to begin their residencies.

Cast
Jensen Daggett as Katie Cooper
Harrison Pruett as Harley Spencer
Donal Logue as Danny Macklin
Kai Soremekun as Nia James
Darryl Fong as Max Chang
Jeffrey D. Sams as Clate Baker
Vincent Ventresca as Tom Powell
Timothy Omundson as Patrick Yeats
Sam McMurray as Douglas McGill

Episodes

Court case
A dispute over the actor's union contract on the show led to the U.S. Supreme Court Case, Marquez v. Screen Actors Guild Inc.

References

External links

1995 American television series debuts
1995 American television series endings
1990s American drama television series
1990s American medical television series
English-language television shows
Fox Broadcasting Company original programming
Television series by Warner Bros. Television Studios
Television shows set in Seattle